Einar Sundt (16 October 1854 – 20 September 1917) was a Norwegian businessman, writer and publisher.

He was born in Christiania to Eilert Sundt and Nicoline Conradine Hansen, and was a cousin of Johan Lauritz Sundt and Karen Sundt. He founded the business magazine Farmand in 1891, and edited the magazine until his death in 1917.

References

1854 births
1917 deaths
Businesspeople from Oslo
Norwegian publishers (people)
Norwegian writers
19th-century Norwegian businesspeople